The 1907 Rutlandshire by-election was held on 11 June 1907.  The by-election was held due to the death of the incumbent Conservative MP, George Henry Finch.  He had held the seat since 1867 and was Father of the House. The by-election was won by the Conservative candidate John Gretton who held the seat until 1918 when the constituency was abolished.

The Women's Social and Political Union suffragettes campaigned against the government. At an open-air meeting in Uppingham, Mary Gawthorpe and Christabel Pankhurst were pelted and Gawthorpe fell unconscious; Sylvia Pankhurst wrote that the "incident and her plucky spirit, made her the heroine of the Election".

References

Rutlandshire by-election
Politics of Rutland
Rutlandshire by-election
Rutlandshire by-election
By-elections to the Parliament of the United Kingdom in East Midlands constituencies
20th century in Rutland